The 2018–19 Florida Gators women's basketball team represents the University of Florida in the sport of basketball during the 2018–19 NCAA Division I women's basketball season. The Gators compete in Division I of the National Collegiate Athletic Association (NCAA) and the Southeastern Conference (SEC). The Gators, led by second-year head coach Cameron Newbauer, play their home games in the O'Connell Center on the university's Gainesville, Florida campus. They finished the season 8–23, 3–13 in SEC play to finish in a tie for twelfth place. They defeated Ole Miss in the first round of the SEC women's tournament before losing to Missouri in the second round.

Previous season
They finished the season 11–19, 3–13 in SEC play to finish in a 3 tie for eleventh place. They lost in the first round of the SEC women's tournament to Ole Miss.

Roster

Schedule

|-
!colspan=6 style=|Non-conference regular season

|-
!colspan=6 style=|SEC regular season

|-
!colspan=12 style=|SEC Tournament

References

Florida Gators women's basketball seasons
Florida
Florida Gators
Florida Gators